was a Japanese comedian, impressionist, actor and choreographer. He was nicknamed .

Maeda was born in Suginami, Tokyo. He was represented with K Dash Stage. Maeda graduated from Tokyo Metropolitan Agricultural High School. At the same school his senior was Taizo Harada of the comedy trio Neptune.

Comedy career

Impressions
Ai
Mayumi Itsuwa
Hikaru Utada
Yōko Oginome
Crystal Kay
Koda Kumi
Ringo Sheena
Ryoko Shinohara
Janet Jackson
Aya Sugimoto
Stevie Wonder
Toshiyuki Nishida
Kohmi Hirose
BoA
Whitney Houston
Michael Jackson
Noriyuki Makihara
Aya Matsuura
Seiko Matsuda
Yumi Matsutoya
Ronaldinho

One-man shows

Filmography

Variety

TV drama

Anime television

Advertisements

Films

Anime films

Stage

Discography
As part of Maeken Trance Project

Videography

Choreography
Music

Nakano Fujo Sisters

AAA

Naohito Fujiki

Yoko Minamino

TV drama

Films

Anime television

Stage

Advertisements

Other television programmes

Director, screenplays

Films

Bibliography

References

Notes

External links
 (Wayback Machine) 
 
 (Wayback Machine) 

Japanese impressionists (entertainers)
Japanese male dancers
Japanese choreographers
Gay dancers
Gay comedians
Japanese LGBT comedians
Japanese gay musicians
Japanese gay actors
Male actors from Tokyo
Comedians from Tokyo
1971 births
2016 deaths